This is a partial list of active, former and demolished places of worship in the Craven District in North Yorkshire in England.

Most or all of Craven falls within the Archdeaconry of Richmond and Craven in the Church of England, the Skipton and Grassington circuit or the Airedale circuit in the Methodist Church, and the Keighley/Skipton deanery in the Roman Catholic Church.

Airton-in-Craven
Friends' Meeting House 
Airton Wesleyan Methodist Chapel (now closed and in residential use): the chapel's Great War memorial plaque is now located in Kirby Malham St Michaels Church.

Bolton
Bolton Abbey
The Priory Church of St Mary and St Cuthbert, Bolton Abbey
It is thought that there may have been a Saxon chapel on the site of the present Bolton Priory church.

Bradley
Bradley Methodist Chapel, formerly Bradley Primitive Methodist Chapel, built in 1897; its foundation stones were laid on 17 April 1997.
South Brook Chapel, a Primitive Methodist chapel dating from 1835.

Broughton
The Anglican church is part of the Parish of Broughton, Marton and Thornton.

Carleton-in-Craven
Carleton in Craven Wesleyan Methodist Church. The electric lighting in the church was installed in memory of the scholars and members who gave their lives during World War I.
Primitive Methodist Chapels: the "My Primitive Methodists" website notes the existence of two Primitive Methodist chapels in this village, one dating from 1861 and the other from 1902.
St Mary the Virgin Parish Church

Cononley
Cononley Methodist Church
St John's Church
The two churches are joined in a Local Ecumenical Partnership (LEP).

Draughton
St Augustine's Church (Anglican), Low Lane, Draughton BD23 6DZ, one of the places of worship of Holy Trinity Church, Skipton.

East Marton
St Peter's Church in East Marton, formerly called Church Marton, part of the Parish of Broughton, Marton and Thornton.
There was an earlier Saxon church in East Marton

Embsay
Bolton Priory church has its historical origins in an Augustinian priory founded at Embsay
Embsay Methodist Church, Main Street. On 1st September 2021, Embsay Methodist Church became a class of St. Andrew's Church, Skipton. Under the Methodist Church of Great Britain's Constitutional Practice and Discipline (CPD), where the number of registered local church members falls below six over four successive quarters, the formal "local church" ceases to be recognised as such and is often treated as a "class" subject to the oversight of another Methodist Church or leader.
St Mary the Virgin (Anglican), Kirk Lane, Embsay, BD23 6SE, part of the Benefice of Embsay with Eastby.

Giggleswick
Church of St Alkelda
An earlier church is believed to have existed on the site of St Alkelda's since Saxon times 
Giggleswick School Chapel

Glusburn
All Saints Church, now a ruin. The church was erected in 1906 and closed on 1 January.

Grassington
Grassington Congregational Church 
Grassington Primitive Methodist chapel
Grassington village has never had a parish church (Church of England).

Ingleton
St Mary's Parish Church 
Evangelical Church
Methodist chapel

Kildwick
St Andrew's Church
An earlier Anglo-Saxon church
Kildwick, Sutton Baptist Chapel

Kirkby Malham
St Michael's Church

Lawkland
A permanent Catholic chaplaincy served by the Benedictines was established at Lawkland Hall around 1650.

Malham-in-Craven
Malham Methodist Church, a class of Bradley Methodist Church since 2022 (see Embsay above re: "classes" in the Methodist Church).
St Helen's Chapel, a chapel of ease, was an ancient religious foundation mentioned in monastic charters from the twelfth century. It was demolished during the reformation. Archaeological digs at the site have been supported by the Ingleborough Archaeology Group.

Settle
Holy Ascension, designed by Thomas Rickman, consecrated in 1838.
St John's Methodist Church 
St Mary and St Michael Catholic Church

Skipton
Part of Ermysted's Grammar School, Gargrave Road, Skipton, was originally a Knights Hospitallers' chapel.
Skipton Castle contains the ruins of a 12th-century chapel
Skipton Parish Church
Skipton Baptist Church, Otley Road, Skipton. In June 1848 two members of the Baptist Village Mission, Samuel Jones and Robert Hogg, visited Skipton and began preaching in the Market Place, and in 1849 a room was obtained in Wesley Place for worship.
St. Andrew's Methodist and United Reformed Church. The Skipton and Grassington Methodist Circuit office is based in the Church Hall.
St Monica's Youth Centre (closed), Gargrave Road, a former convent and girls' boarding school, a grade II listed building.
St Stephen's Catholic Church, Castle View Terrace, Skipton BD23 1NT.

Sutton-in-Craven
Sutton-in-Craven Baptist Church (or South Craven Baptist Church), serving the communities of Sutton, Glusburn, and Crosshills.
The earliest Baptist Church in Sutton-in-Craven was established in 1711.

Thornton-in-Craven
St Mary the Virgin, part of the Parish of Broughton, Marton and Thornton.

Threshfield
St Margaret Clitherow Catholic Church, part of the parish of St Stephen, Skipton.

References

Sources

Craven District
Lists of religious buildings and structures